William Arthur Goebel (June 24, 1887 – February 15, 1960) was an American football player.  He played college football at Yale University and was a consensus selection at the guard position on the 1908 College Football All-America Team.

Gilman was born in Cincinnati, Ohio, in 1887.  He was the son of Justus Goebel, the owner of a wholesale and retail carpet business known as Lowry & Goebel.  Goebel received his preparatory education at Union High School in Phoenix, Arizona, and in private studies in Cincinnati.  He attended college at Yale University, where he was a member of the football, track and wrestling teams.  As a guard for the Yale Bulldogs football team, he was a consensus first-team selection for the 1908 College Football All-America Team. He also won wrestling championships in 1907 and 1909 and was elected president of the Wrestling Association during his senior year. He was a member of Delta Kappa Epsilon while at Yale. 

He died in 1960 and was buried at the Highland Cemetery in Fort Mitchell, Kentucky.

References

External links

1887 births
1960 deaths
American football guards
Yale Bulldogs football players
All-American college football players
Players of American football from Cincinnati